Rock Band 4 is the fourth main installment in the rhythm game series, Rock Band, developed by Harmonix. The game was released in October 2015, following a five-year hiatus from the release of Rock Band 3. Following the over-saturation of the rhythm game market in 2009, weak sales of Rock Band 3 led Harmonix to put the series on hiatus, though the company continued to provide downloadable content through 2013. The release of Rock Band 4 was prompted by several factors, including the market penetration of the eighth generation consoles PlayStation 4 and Xbox One, a stronger internal vision for what Rock Band 4 should be within Harmonix, and continued support from fans of the series.

Rock Band 4 ships with 65 songs on the disc, spanning rock music and other genres from the 1960s to the 2010s. Though the game includes new features such as freestyle guitar solos and improved drum fills, Harmonix has worked to assure that at least 1,700 of the songs in its downloadable content library from past Rock Band games are compatible with Rock Band 4 and that players who have already bought songs on the previous iterations do not have to repurchase the songs in the newer game as long as they stay within the same console library. Harmonix plans to continue to develop additional downloadable content for the game.

Main soundtrack
Rock Band 4 is shipped with 65 songs on disc. 

Rigopulos said of the main soundtrack that "The budget that we’ve allocated for the title supports a top-tier soundtrack". Harmonix allowed for fans to request songs to be included in the game, and tried to include the most-requested songs.

Downloadable content

In addition to developing new songs for purchase following the release of Rock Band 4, Harmonix was also working to ensure that as much of its existing library of downloadable songs would be compatible with the game upon its release as possible; 1,500 songs were available at launch. Nearly all existing Rock Band DLC, including disc exports from previous games (excluding The Beatles: Rock Band), Track Packs, and Rock Band Blitz, will be transitioned to Rock Band 4 within the same console family at no cost to the player (i.e. PlayStation 4 can only import songs purchased on PlayStation 3, and Xbox One can only import songs purchased on Xbox 360). "If you bought a Rock Band song, it should be yours in Rock Band 4," said Sussman. "Everything that you have already exported will come over." At release, only individual songs were available for redownloading within Rock Band 4, with Harmonix working with Sony and Microsoft to offer support for existing song bundles and the various disc exports following the game's release. The Rock Band 3 disc export was available starting in early December 2015 for a small fee. Rock Band 1 songs were available in January 2016, and Rock Band 2 and Lego Rock Band songs followed in February 2016. In May 2018, Harmonix announced it would be bringing the most popular entries as well as fan-requested songs from the Rock Band Network into Rock Band 4; however, unlike regular Rock Band DLC, users are unable to carry over any previously purchased RBN songs due to technical and licensing constraints.

Most of the existing songs are updated with features new to Rock Band 4, specifically the use of Freestyle Guitar Solos for songs with guitar solos, and Freestyle Vocals. For songs previously released that would have vocal harmonies but did not have these harmonies presented in the Rock Band games, typically those prior to Rock Band 3s release, Harmonix has worked with fans to include such harmonies created by the fans in the Rock Band 4 version of these tracks. Other new features of Rock Band 4, such as new drum fills to trigger Overdrive, are automatically supported in any song by the game.

Pre-order songs
Depending on the nature of the sale, a number of songs were available as free bonuses to those that pre-ordered the game through various vendors; these songs were otherwise available at cost to other players.

A pre-order from Amazon included 4 exclusive songs for the Band-in-a-Box Bundle and Guitar Bundle pre-orders, on top of the original 30 free songs for those bundles. They included:

PlayStation Network Plus members who pre-ordered via the PlayStation Store included:

Pre-ordering a digital copy on Xbox One via Xbox Live included:

Pre-orders for the Band-in-a-Box and Guitar Bundles of the game shipped with 30 downloadable songs for free download; many of these include tracks by Harmonix employee-affiliated musical groups that had previously appeared in the first two Rock Band games.

Rivals expansion songs 
Pre-orders for the October 2016 Rivals expansion received these songs free upon the expansion's release, while the songs were later offered on the storefront for individual purchase.

Two additional songs to the above ten are available for those that pre-order the expansion through Amazon.com.

For users that have purchased the "Rivals" expansion, various updates brought more free songs; a December 2016 update brought twelve free songs from local Boston bands who had also been part of the Rockumentary footage; with the January 2017 Online Quickplay update, one additional free song was added to the "Rivals" expansion.

Reception
The game's on-disc soundtrack was generally considered weaker than previous installments, describing it as primarily featuring "B-list" musicians, "lesser-known" songs by notable acts (such as Rush's "A Passage to Bangkok") that had already been featured in Rock Band, and lacking a number of major acts that had historically made appearances in the franchise. Many reviewers were underwhelmed by the soundtrack but did acknowledge several "seriously inspired choices", such as The Protomen.

References

External links

Rock Band 4